A list of films produced by the Marathi language film industry based in Maharashtra in the year 1973.

1973 Releases
A list of Marathi films released in 1973.

References

Lists of 1973 films by country or language
1973 in Indian cinema
1973